Plácido Francisco Domingo Ornelas (born 21 October 1965), better known as Plácido Domingo Jr., is a Mexican-Spanish singer, songwriter and record producer.

Early life
Born in Mexico City to Plácido Domingo and Marta Domingo, from an early age he was exposed to the operatic world and developed a passion for music.

Music career
Domingo Jr. has written songs for many singers including Michael Bolton, Sarah Brightman, Diana Ross and his father.

He participates in the released of album Amore Infinito in 2009 as an executive producer and songwriter; also performed duet with his father. The album which includes verses by Pope John Paul II sung by his father reached the top chart on Billboard Magazine's Top Classical Crossover Albums in 2010.

In 2010, together with SonicProjects Records, Domingo Jr. made his international debut as a performer, collaborating with Grammy award winner producer Juan Cristóbal Losada, with whom he created a Christmas EP called Songs for Christmas - Canciones de Navidad. 

He releases his first album Latidos in Spanish language in April 2017, followed with the English version, Heartbeat in the third quarter of 2017. It includes 11 popular songs from the 50s and 60s with influences of Latin pop, jazz, tango, bolero, cha-cha-cha and bachata, with orchestral arrangements and duets with renowned artists like José Feliciano, Plácido Domingo, Arturo Sandoval, among others.

Personal life
Domingo Jr. was married to Samantha, whom he met in 1994 through their involvement in the Church of Scientology. They have three daughters together. After they divorced, Domingo Jr. left Scientology in 2011.

References

Mexican male singers
Mexican composers
Mexican male composers
Mexican people of Spanish descent
Musicians from Mexico City
Singers from Mexico City
1965 births
Living people
Former Scientologists